Nebulosa rudicula is a moth of the family Notodontidae first described by James S. Miller in 2008. It is found along the Pacific slope of the Cordillera de Talamanca in Costa Rica.

The length of the forewings is 17.5–18 mm for males. The ground color of the forewings is gray brown. The hindwings are translucent white, almost transparent.

Etymology
The species name comes from the Latin word, rudicula (meaning a ladle or spatula) and refers to the spoonshaped valva apex of the male genitalia, a unique feature of this species.

References

Moths described in 2008
Notodontidae